"The Showing Up of Corporal Jones" is the fifth episode of the first series of the British comedy series Dad's Army. It was originally transmitted on Wednesday 4 September 1968.

Synopsis
When Major Regan from GHQ inspects the platoon he decides that Jones must resign, as he is too old. But he also says that if Jones can complete an assault course in 15 minutes he can stay. The platoon organise an elaborate plan to keep Jones amongst them.

Cast

Arthur Lowe as Captain Mainwaring
John Le Mesurier as Sergeant Wilson
Clive Dunn as Lance Corporal Jones
John Laurie as Private Frazer
James Beck as Private Walker
Arnold Ridley as Private Godfrey
Ian Lavender as Private Pike
Janet Davies as Mrs Pike
Martin Wyldeck as Major Regan
Patrick Waddington as Brigadier
Edward Sinclair as Caretaker
Thérèse McMurray as Girl at the Window

Notes
 The platoon receive their uniforms in this episode.
 This episode includes the only occasion Mainwaring says the word "bastard".
 Strangely Wilson says "I've never heard you swear before, Sir" after Mainwaring says "Bloody cheek!" during The Lion Has Phones, an episode from Series 3, despite the fact he clearly hears Mainwaring say "the rotten bastard", initially thinking Mainwaring is directing the insult at him.
 This episode was planned for transmission on Wednesday 3 July.

References

External links

Dad's Army (series 1) episodes
Dad's Army radio episodes
1968 British television episodes